Charles Basch is the Richard March Hoe Professor of Health and Education at Teachers College, Columbia University, New York City, New York. He teaches courses related to epidemiology, planning and evaluation. Before coming to Teachers College, he was Assistant Professor of Community Health Education at Russell Sage College in Troy, New York.

He earned his B.S. and M.S. in community health education at the State University of New York at Brockport and his Ph.D. in health education at Southern Illinois University Carbondale, where he studied under four of the field's most prominent leaders, Robert S. Gold, David F. Duncan, Elena Sliepcevich, and Robert Russell.

Basch's main scholarly interests are improving understanding of (1) health-related decision making, (2) dissemination and implementation of effective health-related programs and policies, and (3) the influence of health factors on educational outcomes in urban minority youth. In particular, he has documented a link between childhood health and learning in school. His research identifies seven factors (poor vision, asthma, teen pregnancy, aggression and violence, physical inactivity, ADHD, and insufficient breakfast) that can and do lead to health disparities and contribute to poorer academic achievement. He notes that students will perform and learn better every day if they are "well-rested and well-nourished".  During his 25 years at Teachers College, he has directed approximately $15 million of grant-funded research and program development (primarily supported by the National Institutes of Health), and he continues to do so. His work has yielded over 100 scholarly publications.

References

 Basch, C. E., & Duncan, D. F. (1985). Promoting high level wellness in a rural state: The wellness education workshop. Health Values, 9(4), 18–23.
 Basch, C.E. (2010). Healthier Students Are Better Learners: A Missing Link in Efforts to Close the Achievement Gap. Equity Matters: Research Review No. 6. New York: The Campaign for Educational Equity.
 Basch, C.E. (2011). Healthier students are better learners: a missing link in school reforms to close the achievement gap. Journal of School Health, 81(10), 593–598.
 Blonska, J. (March 31, 2011). Spotlight on Charles E. Basch: Healthier Students Are Better Learners. Healthy Schools Campaign,  http://www.healthyschoolscampaign.org/blog/spotlight-on-charles-e-basch-healthier-students-are-better-learners
 Wethington, C. (Nov. 12, 2013). Closing the achievement gap: a new vision for making it happen. MinnPost, Community Voices http://www.minnpost.com/community-voices/2013/11/closing-achievement-gap-new-vision-making-it-happen

External links
http://www.tc.columbia.edu/hbs/HealthEd/index.asp?Id=Faculty&Info=Charles+Basch%2C+Ph.D.

Columbia University faculty
Teachers College, Columbia University faculty
Fellows of the American Academy of Health Behavior
American health educators
Living people
Year of birth missing (living people)